Nealcidion antennatum is a species of beetle in the family Cerambycidae. It was described by Monne and Monne in 2009. This species of beetle have only been found in Central and South America.

References

Nealcidion
Beetles described in 2009